Eusebio Escobar Ramírez (born 2 July 1936) was a Colombian footballer. He was a member of the Colombia national football team at the 1962 FIFA World Cup which was held in Chile and played in two qualifying matches for the tournament. Escobar is one of the all-time leading goal-scorers in the history of the Colombian league, scoring 159 goals during his career with Deportivo Cali, Atlético Bucaramanga, América de Cali, Deportivo Pereira, Deportes Quindío, Atlético Nacional, Independiente Medellín, and Deportivo Manizales.

References

External links

1936 births
Living people
Colombian footballers
Colombia international footballers
1962 FIFA World Cup players
Deportivo Cali footballers
Atlético Bucaramanga footballers
América de Cali footballers
Deportivo Pereira footballers
Deportes Quindío footballers
Atlético Nacional footballers
Independiente Medellín footballers
Once Caldas footballers
Categoría Primera A players
Association football forwards